Icelita is a genus of moths belonging to the subfamily Olethreutinae of the family Tortricidae.

Species
Icelita antecellana (Kuznetzov, 1988)
Icelita cirrholepida Clarke, 1976
Icelita indentata (Bradley, 1957)
Icelita monela Clarke, 1976
Icelita tatarana Bradley, 1957

See also
List of Tortricidae genera

References

External links
tortricidae.com

Tortricidae genera
Olethreutinae